Martin Peško is a Slovak retired footballer.

Honours
Israeli Second Division
2000-01

References

1972 births
Living people
Czechoslovak footballers
Slovak footballers
FC Nitra players
MŠK Rimavská Sobota players
Hapoel Ashdod F.C. players
Hapoel Tzafririm Holon F.C. players
Maccabi Kiryat Gat F.C. players
Maccabi Netanya F.C. players
FC DAC 1904 Dunajská Streda players
Slovak Super Liga players
Liga Leumit players
Israeli Premier League players
Expatriate footballers in Israel
Slovak expatriate sportspeople in Israel
Association football goalkeepers